Formotosena montivaga is a cicada species from Southeast Asia that was formerly placed in the genus Tosena. It was described in 1889 by Distant from material collected in the Naga Hills which are on the border of India and Burma.

References

Insects described in 1889
Hemiptera of Asia
Taxa named by William Lucas Distant
Polyneurini